Jahanabad-e Deh Nazer (also Romanized as Jahānābād-e Deh Naẓer; also known as Jahānābād) is a village in Chahdegal Rural District, Negin Kavir District, Fahraj County, Kerman Province, Iran. At the 2006 census, its population was 64, in 14 families.

References 

Populated places in Fahraj County